Östra Grevie is a locality situated in Vellinge Municipality, Skåne County, Sweden with 598 inhabitants in 2010.

References 

Populated places in Vellinge Municipality
Populated places in Skåne County